The Federated States of Micronesia will compete at the 2022 World Athletics Championships in Eugene, Oregon, United States, from 15 to 24 July 2022.

Results
The Federated States of Micronesia has entered 1 athletes.

Men 
Track and road events

References

External links
Oregon22｜WCH 22｜World Athletics

Nations at the 2022 World Athletics Championships
World Championships in Athletics
Federated States of Micronesia at the World Championships in Athletics